Krisztina Tóth (born 29 May 1974 in Miskolc, Hungary) is a Hungarian table tennis player from Gödöllő (Hungary), who currently resides in Augsburg, Germany. She has won several medals in single, doubles, and team events in the Table Tennis European Championships, the Table Tennis World Cup, and the World Table Tennis Championships.

General interest
Tóth began playing table tennis at the age of 8 in her hometown Gödöllő. She was inspired to do so by her uncle, who was a professional table tennis player. She still plays with her very first racket.

In 2008, she became an honorary citizen of Gödöllő.

Charity work
Tóth is a promoter of children's table tennis in Hungary. She is also supporting less privileged families in her home country.

Career records
Singles (as of 10 November 2011)
Olympics: round of 16 (2000)
World Championships: round of 16 (2001, 05, 09)
World Cup appearances: 6. Record: 9–12th (1997, 98, 2001, 02, 10)
Pro Tour winner (2): 2004 Danish Open; 2005 Russian Open Runner-up (4): 2000 Croatian Open; 2003 Danish Open; 2008 Austrian Open; 2010 Slovenian Open
Pro Tour Grand Finals appearances: 1. Record: QF (2000)
European Championships: runner-up (1996, 2002); SF (1998, 2008)
Europe Top-12: 2nd (2005); 3rd (2003, 10)

Women's doubles
Olympics: 4th (2000)
World Championships: SF (1995)
Pro Tour winner (6): 1998 Croatian Open; 1999 Qatar, German Open; 2004 Chile, Brazil Open; 2005 Russian Open Runner-up (4): 1996 Italian Open; 2004 Danish Open; 2005 Qatar Open; 2006 Russian Open
Pro Tour Grand Finals appearances: 2. Record: QF (1996, 99)
European Championships: winner (1994, 2000, 08); runner-up (2003, 05, 07)

Mixed doubles
World Championships: round of 16 (1993, 95, 97, 99)
European Championships: winner (1996, 2003); SF (2005, 07)

Team
World Championships: 5th (2008)
World Team Cup: 3rd (1995, 2007)
European Championships: 1st (2000, 07); 2nd (1996, 98, 2008)

See also
 List of table tennis players

References

1974 births
Living people
Hungarian female table tennis players
Table tennis players at the 1996 Summer Olympics
Table tennis players at the 2000 Summer Olympics
Table tennis players at the 2004 Summer Olympics
Table tennis players at the 2008 Summer Olympics
Olympic table tennis players of Hungary
Table tennis players at the 2012 Summer Olympics
Sportspeople from Miskolc